Australia Fair Shopping Centre is a dual-level regional shopping centre covering  located in Southport, Gold Coast, Queensland. The centre also incorporates a five-level office tower comprising  of office space, housing specialist services and commercial offices.

History 
1983 Australia Fair West, originally known as Scarborough Fair, was built and anchored by Franklins. It was constructed on the former site of administrative and bottling buildings for the South Coast Co-Operative Dairy Association, which was designed by architects T.R. Hall and L.B. Phillips in 1936 on the corner of Scarborough and Young Streets. The dairy buildings were demolished in 1972. Australia Fair West contained Franklins, Treasureway, and 40 specialty shops with off-road parking. 

1984

Scarborough Fair was built incorporating a Coles Supermarket and Kmart Store.

1989 Scarborough Fair Shopping Centre doubled its size and extended through to a pedestrianised Nerang Street Mall. Work on Australia Fair Shopping Centre was based around the old Scarborough Fair Retail Centre and retail anchors Kmart, Coles, Woolworths and Franklins.

1990: Australia Fair opened on 10 April 1990 a project which took more than a year and $300 million to complete. At completion, Australia Fair Shopping Centre had the largest concentration of specialty stores and was the only shopping centre in the Gold Coast let alone nation with three supermarket chains at the time: Woolworths, Coles and Franklins.

1991: The 52,000 square metre shopping development is the first of its kind in Australia and one of the largest in Queensland.

1993: An extension introduced the centre to a six-cinema complex and also created a Leisure Court Retail precinct.

1995 The Fashion Boulevard, Broadwater Food Court and Fresh Food Marketplace were refurbished and renamed to establish these precincts. The owner acquired the ex-State School site next to Australia Fair West for expansion purposes.

1997–1998: Extensions were completed, cinemas expanded from 6 to 10 and reconfiguration of the Cinema Leisure Court Retail/Entertainment precinct.

1998–1999Colonial First State bought into the joint-venture ownership of Australia Fair with MEPC. The sale deal also included the former state school redevelopment site in Garden Street. 'Australia Fair set for $16m upgrade'...Owners announce their $16m refurbishment and upgrade. A major part of the refurb is the upgrade of the Fig Tree Food Court, remodeling of tenancies, additional weatherproof structure and replacement of an escalator.

2001: Gordon Fu purchases Australia Fair from Colonial First State.

2002–2004 $2.7 million spent on an upgrade to flooring, directional signage and Amenities/facilities upgrade which enhances the centre's appearance and image for Southport.

Anchors
Event Cinemas
Coles
Woolworths
Kmart

Parking & public transport 
The centre has undercover and rooftop parking for 2,500 cars, located off Marine Parade.

The Southport light rail station is located on the corner of Nerang Street and Scarborough Street and provides tram connections to the Gold Coast University Hospital and south towards Surfers Paradise and Broadbeach. Southport Bus Station, one of the main bus stations in the city provides regular and high frequency services to Helensvale Station, Robina, Sea World/Main Beach and Biggera Waters.

References

External links
Australia Fair Shopping Centre - Website

Southport, Queensland
Shopping centres on the Gold Coast, Queensland
Shopping malls established in 1983
1983 establishments in Australia